Nyssodrysternum fasciatum is a species of beetle in the family Cerambycidae. It was described by Gilmour in 1960.

References

Nyssodrysternum
Beetles described in 1960